This is a list of Italian television related events from 2004.

Events
6 May - Serena Garitta wins the fourth season of Grande Fratello.
2 December - Jonathan Kashanian wins the fifth season of Grande Fratello.

Debuts

Domestic
28 January - Winx Club (Rai 2) (2004–present)

International
30 August -  SpongeBob SquarePants (Italia 1) (1999–present)
9 September - / Tripping the Rift (Fox) (2004–2007)
/ Lapitch the Little Shoemaker Rai 2 (2000)

Television shows

RAI

Drama 

 Luisa Sanfelice – by the Taviani Brothers, from the Alexandre Dumas’ novel, with Laetitia Casta in the title role, Adriano Giannini and Emilio Solfrizzi (Fenrdinand I); 2 episodes.

Variety 

 Bitte, keine reklame (In German, “Please, no publicity”) - experimental show about music, philosophy and mysticism, hosted by Franco Battiato, with Sonia Bergamasco.

Mediaset
Grande Fratello (2000–present)

Ending this year

Births

Deaths

References

See also
List of Italian films of 2004